Sergio Romero Pizarro (born 8 December 1938) is a Chilean politician.

In 2019, he was appointed as the Ambassador of Chile in Italy.

References

External links
Chilean National Congress Library Profile

1938 births
Living people
Chilean people
Chilean politicians
National Renewal (Chile) politicians
Pontifical Catholic University of Chile alumni
Presidents of the Senate of Chile